The Soviet Union participated in 14 games of the Universiade, from the 1959 Summer Universiade to the 1991 Summer Universiade, until the dissolution of the Soviet Union in 1991.

Medal count
Soviet Union won 987 medals at the Summer Universiade and are at the 3rd rank in the all-time Summer Universiade medal table.

See also
Soviet Union at the Olympics
Soviet Union at the Paralympics

References

External links
 FISU History at the FISU

 
Nations at the Universiade
Student sport in the Soviet Union